is a Japanese politician who served in the House of Representatives in the Diet (national legislature) as a member of the Democratic Party of Japan. A native of Mutsu, Aomori and graduate of Hirosaki Gakuin University she ran for the Diet for the first time in 2000 after serving three terms in the city assembly of Nemuro, Hokkaido since 1989. In her second attempt, she won a seat in the House of Representatives in the 2003 general election.

In the 2009 general election, Nakano was the only Democratic incumbent countrywide to lose her district seat to a Liberal Democrat. As the only losing Democratic district candidate in Hokkaidō though, she was safely reelected via the proportional representation block. She lost her seat in 2012.

References

External links 
  

Members of the House of Representatives (Japan)
Female members of the House of Representatives (Japan)
Democratic Party of Japan politicians
Politicians from Aomori Prefecture
Living people
1959 births
People from Mutsu, Aomori
Japanese municipal councilors
Politicians from Hokkaido
21st-century Japanese politicians
21st-century Japanese women politicians